The 1986 Snooker World Cup was a team snooker tournament played that took place between 20 and 23 March 1986 at the Bournemouth International Centre in Bournemouth, England. Fersina Windows were the sponsors for the next two years. Car Care Plan became the sponsors for this year's tournament.

As champions it was Ireland's turn to be played in 2 separate teams with the team which won the previous year played as Ireland "A" with Dennis Taylor, Alex Higgins and Eugene Hughes and Ireland "B" with Patsy Fagan, Tommy Murphy and Paddy Browne. Ireland "A" went on to beat Canada to retain the title, only the second nation to do so.
 


Main draw

Teams

Final

References

World Cup (snooker)
1986 in snooker